The Fred Lawrence Whipple Observatory is an American  astronomical observatory owned and operated by the Smithsonian Astrophysical Observatory (SAO); it is their largest field installation outside of their main site in Cambridge, Massachusetts.  It is located near Amado, Arizona on the summit, a ridge and at the foot of Mount Hopkins.

Research activities include imaging and spectroscopy of extragalactic, stellar, solar system and extra-solar bodies, as well as gamma-ray and cosmic-ray astronomy.

History
In 1966, roadwork began on the current site with funding granted for the Smithsonian Mt. Hopkins Observatory. The Whipple 10-meter gamma-ray telescope was constructed in 1968.

Formerly known as The Mount Hopkins Observatory, the observatory was renamed in late 1981 in honor of Fred Lawrence Whipple, noted planetary expert, space science pioneer, and director emeritus of SAO, under whose leadership the Arizona facility was established.

Equipment

Whipple observatory hosts the MMT Observatory, which is jointly run by SAO and the University of Arizona and houses a 6.5-meter telescope. The observatory also has 1.5- and 1.2-meter reflectors and a second 1.3-meter reflector named PAIRITEL (Peters Automated IR Imaging Telescope, ex-2MASS ). Also on site is the HATNet (Hungarian-made Automated Telescope) network, the MEarth Project, and four 0.7-meter telescopes of the automated Miniature Exoplanet Radial Velocity Array (MINERVA).

The observatory is known for its pioneering work in ground-based gamma-ray astronomy through the development of the Imaging Atmospheric Cherenkov Technique (IACT) with the Whipple 10-meter Telescope during the early 1980s. The Whipple 10-meter is currently preparing to be decommissioned after forty years of service.

In April 2007, VERITAS (a system of 4 IACT telescopes with 12-meter reflectors) started full operations at the FLWO basecamp. Subsequently, in September 2009, after a 4-month effort, one of the telescopes was moved to a new position, making the array symmetric and increasing its sensitivity.

See also 
List of astronomical observatories
Whipple (spacecraft)

References

External links
 
 Arizona.edu: Fred Lawrence Whipple Observatory 
 Harvard.edu: Whipple Observatory Visitor's Center

 
Astronomical observatories in Arizona
Santa Rita Mountains
Science museums in Arizona
Museums in Santa Cruz County, Arizona
Buildings and structures in Santa Cruz County, Arizona
Smithsonian Institution research programs
Harvard–Smithsonian Center for Astrophysics
1968 establishments in Arizona
Research institutes in Arizona